Tanglewood Lake is a small reservoir located northeast of De Lancey in Delaware County, New York. Tanglewood Lake drains south via an unnamed creek that flows into Bagley Brook.

See also
 List of lakes in New York

References 

Lakes of New York (state)
Lakes of Delaware County, New York
Reservoirs in Delaware County, New York